Alfred Vernon (A.V.) Galbraith (29 June 1890 – 29 March 1949) was a highly regarded Chairman of the Forests Commission Victoria for 22 years from 1927 until his death.

Galbraith was born at Geelong in Victoria, Australia, the only son of James Galbraith and his wife Maria. He trained as an accountant and became assistant town clerk at the City of Geelong at the age of 21 and later appointed chief clerk at the Country Roads Board.

During World War One, Galbraith enlisted in the Australian Imperial Force (AIF) in February 1916, aged nearly 26. He was appointed lieutenant in the 3 Divisional Train of the Army Service Corps and later promoted to the rank of captain in 1917. Galbraith served in both England and France but was gassed at Messines. He returned to Australia in 1919 and discharged but suffered ongoing medical problems.

Commissioner and Chairman 
Upon his return from military service, Galbraith was recruited as the Secretary to a newly established three-person Forests Commission Victoria (FCV) after amendments to Forest Act in December 1918. The Commission was headed by a young Welsh Forester, Owen Jones and the other commissioners included Hugh Robert Mackay and William James Code.

In September 1924 Owen Jones moved to a new position in New Zealand and Galbraith was appointed as one of three Commissioners with Code as Chairman. When Code retired in 1927, Galbraith was elevated to Chairman, a position he held until his death in 1949. During the next 22 years of Galbraith's tenure as Chairman, William Wilson Gay (ex-principal of the Victorian School of Forestry), Mr D. Ingle, Mr T. W. Newton, Mr Andrew A. Hone and Finton George Gerraty held positions as Commissioners at various times.

Although revenue from timber sales declined during the Great Depression, Galbraith channelled substantial government funds for unemployment relief works which were well suited to unskilled manual labour such as firebreak slashing, silvicultural thinning, weed spraying and rabbit control. By 1935-36 the Forests Commission was employing almost 9,000 men in relief works and a further 1,200 boys under a "Youth for Conservation Plan". Galbraith worked two prominent Melbourne businessmen and philanthropists, Herbert Robinson Brookes and George Richard Nicholas (of Aspro fame) to established the unique and enterprising “Boys Camp” at Noojee to provide particular employment and training opportunities for young people.

Under the leadership of Galbraith, the trajectory of the Forests Commission from its inception in 1918 until the beginning of the Second World War was one of periodic political conflict, varying budgets but almost continuous organisational expansion and relative autonomy.

1939 Bushfires 
The Black Friday bushfires on 13 January 1939 where nearly 2 million hectares burnt, 69 sawmills were destroyed, 71 people died and several towns were entirely obliterated became a landmark in the history of the State of Victoria and a major turning point in the story of the Forests Commission. Galbraith remained Chairman throughout this difficult period and the subsequent Royal Commission headed by Judge Leonard Stretton.

The Stretton Royal Commission has been called one of the most significant inquiries in the history of Victorian public administration and its recommendations led to sweeping changes and increases in funding and responsibilities.  Galbraith who survived as Chairman of the Commission was described by Judge Stretton as “a man of moral integrity” subsequently appointed Alfred Oscar Lawrence in December 1939 as the new Chief Fire Officer to lead and modernise the Forests Commission's shattered fire fighting force.

After the 1939 bushfires, Galbraith oversaw a massive timber salvage program in the Central Highlands that took nearly 15 years to complete. This operation was made more difficult due to manpower shortages during the war years combined with many FCV staff volunteering for military service with the 2/2 Forestry Company, AIF.

The war years also saw pressing needs for firewood for domestic use and charcoal as fuel for cars. Galbraith ordered the building of Kurth Kiln at Gembrook.

From its earliest days, the Commission had promoted using forest and sawmill waste for the production of wood pulp. Industry eventually began to show some interest and in 1936. Under Galbraith's Chairmanship, the Commission and Australian Paper Manufacturers Ltd (APM) reached an agreement which gave certain pulpwood rights to the company for fifty years over an area of about 200,000 ha of State forest.  The Commission retained control over the pulpwood harvesting operations to ensure that pulpwood remain secondary to the use of the more valuable types of produce such as sawlogs, poles and piles, the main source being of the ash eucalypts from both mature trees and thinnings. The company proceeded to establish a plant at Maryvale in Gippsland for the manufacture of Kraft papers. It came into production in October 1939 and for some years much of its feedstock came from the 1939 fire-killed ash forest.

After the end of World War Two in 1945, Australia experienced a prolonged housing boom and a civil rehabilitation period and Galbraith increased the Commissions intake of graduates at the Victorian School of Forestry (VSF) to meet the demands on Victoria's forest resources.

Forestry Training 
Following the withdrawal from strained arrangements with the Australian Forestry School in Canberra in 1930 Galbraith, or A.V. as he was commonly known, personally took responsibility for raising standards at the Victorian School of Forestry (VSF) at Creswick and building closer ties with the University of Melbourne. He increased academic staff at VSF and gave the Principal Edwin James Semmens more autonomy for the management of the school and its 1200 acre demonstration forest. One major long-term consequence was more VSF graduates undertook higher training at Universities at home and abroad.

His efforts culminated in the University of Melbourne establishing a Bachelor of Science in Forestry in the mid-1940s. VSF students were then able undertake two years at the University after completing the three-year Associate Diploma course at Creswick.

Galbraith was not trained as a forester he possessed the Diploma of Commerce from Melbourne University and was an Associate of the Institute of Chartered Accountants.  However, while Chairman, he wrote a major thesis “Eucalyptus regnans- Its silviculture, management & utilisation in Victoria” which he submitted in July 1935 to earn the very first Diploma of Forestry (Victoria) awarded by the Board of Forestry Education. This seminal work was later published in 1937 as a small booklet and was used to train Victorian forestry and botany students. This work was prior to the groundbreaking research into mountain ash done in mid-1950s by the world renowned Dr David Hungerford Ashton from the botany school at the University of Melbourne.

Galbraith was also widely known throughout Australia and overseas. He took a leading role in organising the 1928 British Empire Forestry Conference in Australia and represented Victoria at a similar conference in 1935. He planned to attend the 1947 conference in England but was forced to withdraw due to failing health.

Alfred Vernon Galbraith died 29 March 1949, while still Chairman of the Forests Commission, aged 58. Later in April 1949, Finton George Gerraty who began his forestry career at Creswick in 1915 was appointed as the new Chairman.

Among his many legacies, the new student accommodation block, AVG House, at the Victorian School of Forestry was named in his honour in 1961.

References

External links 
 McHugh, Peter. (2020). Forests and Bushfire History of Victoria : A compilation of short stories, Victoria.  https://nla.gov.au/nla.obj-2899074696/view
FCRPA - Forests Commission Retired Personnel Association (Peter McHugh) - https://www.victoriasforestryheritage.org.au/

Australian foresters
1890 births
1949 deaths